The 2018 Armenian Cup Final was the 27th Armenian Cup Final, and the final match of the 2017–18 Armenian Cup. It was played at the Republican Stadium in Yerevan, Armenia, on 16 May 2018, and was contested by Gandzasar Kapan and Alashkert. 
It was Alashkert's first Cup final appearance, and Gandzasar Kapan's second, having lost to Pyunik in 2014. Gandzasar Kapan were victorious 4–3 on penalties after the game finished 0–0 in normal time and 1–1 after extra time, with Mihran Manasyan scoring for Alashkert and Lubambo Musonda scoring the equaled for Gandzasar Kapan.

Match

Details

References

Armenian Cup Finals
Cup Final